Urocampus is a genus of pipefishes native to the western Pacific Ocean.

Species
There are currently two recognized species in this genus:
 Urocampus carinirostris Castelnau, 1872 (Hairy pipefish)
 Urocampus nanus Günther, 1870 (Barbed pipefish)

References

Syngnathidae
Marine fish genera
Taxa named by Albert Günther